A Journey Through Time is the seventh studio album from American singer Benny Mardones. It was released in 2002 by Crazy Boy Records.

Background
A Journey Through Time was originally intended as the soundtrack to the Mardones' documentary "Into The Night: The Benny Mardones Story". However, the album became a loosely separated project, acting as a "musical biography". The album saw Mardones recording the songs that were important to him personally, whether they were new songs or covers. Mardones' illustrated their significance in the liner notes.

On the album, a new version of "Into the Night" was recorded, along with an acoustic version. The album featured the previously unrecorded song "Fool for Falling in Love", a song written by Mardones and Roy Orbison. The album also features new versions of past Mardones songs including "Sheila C." and "How Could You Love Me". A cover of the Diana Ross & the Supremes/The Temptations song "I'm Gonna Make You Love Me" is included.

"I Need a Miracle" received national airplay and charted on the American Adult Contemporary charts, peaking at No. 30 in late 2002. The song "I Want It All" also entered the American Adult Contemporary charts, where it peaked at No. 25 in early 2003. In an August 2002 issue of Billboard, it was reported that the "I Need a Miracle" single had almost four dozen Adult Contemporary outlets who were believers in the song during its first week of release. It was also noted that this was rare for the format and that the record was therefore already garnering major attention.

Track listing

Critical reception 

AllMusic stated: "This functions a bit as a musical biography, but it's a newly-written one, since all of the songs are new recordings. It's cleanly produced, but not extravagantly so, and Mardones sings with conviction, giving this real spine; if the new version of "Into the Night" is not a patch on the original - which, even if it flies under the radar, is so popular for a reason - it is hardly embarrassing, and the acoustic version reveals that Mardones can still breathe life into a song he's sung countless times. Throughout Journey Through Time he does this, singing his past as if it were his present. This may not win over doubters - after all, his powerful arena rock voice may have limited appeal - but for fans, this is a revealing and successful look back at his career, and a worthy companion to the documentary which, unfortunately, has yet to be released on video."

Upon release, Billboard reviewed the "I Need a Miracle" single, commenting: ""I Need a Miracle" is clearly a post-Sept. 11 anthem of hope and perseverance, and the mid-tempo showcases the edgy vocalist delivering an emotive performance - think a slightly more mellow Joe Cocker. But the real appeal for many AC stations is the "tribute" version of the song, which contains numerous statements of overt patriotism from "random" Americans. It's a tried-and-true formula that has worked before - remember Dennis DeYoung's "Desert Moon"? - and while it may be perceived as pretty cheesy at points, the song certainly works hard to tug at the heartstrings - and at what better time, with the first anniversary of our nation's greatest tragedy a mere month away."

Chart performance

Singles
"I Need a Miracle"

"I Want It All"

Personnel
 Benny Mardones - vocals
 Greg Ross - producer, executive producer
 Joel Diamond, Duane Evans, Robert Tepper - producer
 Jim Ervin - keyboards, percussion, producer
 Jim Brickman - guest artist
 Mike Jackson - guitar, backing vocals
 Angie Jeree Singers, D.L. Byron - backing vocals
 Tamara Walker - vocals
 Bruce Cox - piano
 Kinny Landrum - keyboards
 Paul Levante, Bruce Watson - guitar
 Lance Morrison, Dean Rispler - bass
 Mark Levy - drums
 Tommy Oliver - orchestration
 Jesse Cannon, Csaba Petocz - engineer
 Alan Douches - mixing

References

2002 albums
Benny Mardones albums